Kassapa, Kashyapa, or Kasyapa may refer to:
Kassapa Buddha, also known as Kāśyapa Buddha, an ancient Buddha
Kashyapa I of Anuradhapura (r. 473–495), king of Sri Lanka
Kashyapa or Kāśyapa, a Hindu holy person

See also
Mahākāśyapa or Mahakassapa, disciple of Śakyamuni Buddha